Joe Gibson may refer to:
 Joe Gibson (American football)
 Joe Gibson (footballer)

See also
 Joseph Gibson, Americo-Liberian politician
 Joseph Deighton Gibson Jr., American radio disc jockey and actor
 Joey Gibson (political activist), American right-wing activist